Mathonville is a commune in the Seine-Maritime department in the Normandy region in northern France.

Its inhabitants are called Mathonville and Mathonvillaises.

Geography

Surrounded by the municipalities of Bosc-Bordel, Montérolier and Buchy, Mathonville is located 28 km northeast of Mont-Saint-Aignan, the largest city nearby.

Population

See also
Communes of the Seine-Maritime department

References

Communes of Seine-Maritime